Parashorea macrophylla  is a species of plant in the family Dipterocarpaceae. The name macrophylla is derived from Greek (makros = big and phullon = leaf) and refers to the species extremely large leaves (30-50 x 16–24 cm). It is endemic to Borneo, being found in Brunei, Sarawak and West Kalimantan. The timber is sold under the trade name of white lauan or white seraya. It occurs in protected areas in Sarawak but elsewhere it is threatened by habitat loss.

References

macrophylla
Endemic flora of Borneo
Trees of Borneo
Taxonomy articles created by Polbot